Paul Shinji Sasaki (パウロ 佐々木 鎮次)、(March 11, 1885 – December 21, 1946) was an Anglican bishop of the Diocese of Mid-Japan and later of Tokyo, in the Nippon Sei Ko Kai, the Province of the Anglican Communion in Japan.

Early life and education
Sasaki studied at Kelham Hall of the Society of the Sacred Mission and at Westcott House, Cambridge, England. He was ordained deacon on December 21, 1912 and priest on April 25, 1917, by the Right Reverend Cecil Henry Boutflower, Bishop of South Tokyo.

Sasaki worked as Professor of Liturgics and Applied Theology at Central Theological College, Tokyo and on July 25, 1935 was consecrated in Nagoya as the first Japanese diocesan bishop of Mid-Japan, a region stretching from Nagoya to Niigata, formerly served by the missionary work of the Anglican Church of Canada. As bishop he succeeded Canadian Heber J. Hamilton.

Leadership During the Second World War
Sasaki served as the Primate of the Nippon Sei Ko Kai throughout much of the Second World War. During this period the majority of Protestant churches in Japan were forcibly brought together by the Japanese wartime government to form the United Church of Christ in Japan, or Kyodan. Reflecting the distinctive doctrinal character of the Anglican Communion, and a fear of state intervention in religion, many individual Nippon Sei Ko Kai congregations refused to join.

Sasaki, in a written statement issued in October 1942 and signed by the majority of the Japanese bishops, was adamant in rejecting the proposed union with Kyodan. The statement upheld the authority of the Anglican church's episcopacy and Apostolic succession and highlighted, among other reasons for rejecting the government proposal, the failure of Kyodan to adopt the Apostles Creed as one of its main theological tenets.

The cost of resistance to and non-cooperation with the government's religious policies was public criticism by prominent lay and ordained members of the Nippon Sei Ko Kai, harassment by the military police and periods of imprisonment for church leaders such as Sasaki, as well as Bishops Samuel Heaslett and Todomu Sugai.

On January 25, 1944, Sasaki was installed at St. Andrew's Cathedral, Tokyo as Bishop of Tokyo to replace Bishop Peter Yonetaro Matsui

During late 1944, government prosecutors examined Sasaki and Bishop of South Tokyo Todomu Sugai (須貝 止), on numerous occasions; military police detaining them for extended periods at Sugamo Prison. Reports of torture at the hands of the military police at Sugamo Prison are also recorded.  On their release on the 16th June 1945, both men were found malnourished and in poor health from their confinement, neither being able to walk without assistance.

Sasaki had remained in Tokyo throughout the Allied incendiary bombing of the city. At considerable personal risk, he held fast to the principle that religion should not be unduly interfered with by the state. Sasaki died less than a year after his release from prison at the end of the war.

Legacy

For his courage and leadership of the Japanese Anglican community during the Second World War Sasaki is commemorated (along with Bishop of Honan Lindel Tsen) on February 24 on the Calendar of saints (Anglican Church of Canada).

The Nippon Sei Ko Kai, reflecting on the legacy of Bishop Sasaki, the Japanese occupation of China and Korea, actions during wartime and the challenge of maintaining authentic Christian witness in the face of nationalist government policy, adopted a formal Statement of War Responsibility at its General Synod in 1996.

A presentation of this statement and homily by the Rev. Canon Susan Cole-King, daughter of Leonard Wilson, the Bishop of Singapore during the Japanese occupation, was made at a liturgy led by Nippon Sei Ko Kai bishops celebrating the Feast of the Transfiguration at the 1998 Lambeth Conference.

The NSKK remains active in multi-year projects promoting peace, reconciliation and youth exchange programs between East Asian nations. In 2013 the NSKK co-hosted with the Anglican Church of Korea, the 2nd Worldwide Anglican Peace Conference in Okinawa.

See also

Anglican Church in Japan
Anglican Communion

References

"Mid-Japan Bishop Elected by Synod," in The Living Church, June 8, 1935, p. 731.

External links
Liturgical commemoration and brief biography

Japanese Anglican bishops
1885 births
1946 deaths
Anglican Primates of the Nippon Sei Ko Kai
Anglican Church in Japan
Alumni of Westcott House, Cambridge
Anglican bishops of Tokyo